Richard Hughes (born September 26, 1932) is a former American football player who played for Pittsburgh Steelers of the National Football League (NFL). He played college football at the University of Tulsa.

References

1932 births
Living people
American football halfbacks
Pittsburgh Steelers players
Tulsa Golden Hurricane football players
Players of American football from Buffalo, New York